Mark Doubleday (born 10 August 1973 in Sydney) is an Australian baseball player. He represented Australia at the 1996 Summer Olympics.

References

1973 births
Living people
Australian expatriate baseball players in the United States
Baseball players at the 1996 Summer Olympics
Louisiana Tech Bulldogs baseball players
Olympic baseball players of Australia
Baseball players from Sydney